The '59 Sound is the second studio album by American punk rock band the Gaslight Anthem, released on August 19, 2008, by record label SideOneDummy.

In December 2008, eMusic named The '59 Sound the best album of 2008. NME rated it as the 47th best album of the year. The title track was number 62 on Rolling Stones list of the 100 Best Songs of 2008.

In July 2009, following Bruce Springsteen's guest appearances with the band at Glastonbury and Hyde Park, sales of the album doubled. In 2018 The Gaslight Anthem released The '59 Sounds Sessions, a companion album to The 59 Sound featuring early versions of songs from the album as well as rarities and b-sides.

Recording
Regarding the differences between The '59 Sound and their first full-length album, Sink or Swim, guitarist Alex Rosamilia noted that, "For Sink or Swim, we had a week or so and what we brought to the studio. For [this] last record we had about 5 weeks and quite the arsenal of gear to tear through. Which did lead to a couple ideas I don't think we would've had otherwise." The album was produced and mixed at Sage and Sound Studios and Mad Dog Studios, and was mastered at Precision Mastering, all in Los Angeles, CA.

Release
The album was released on August 19, 2008, and peaked on the Billboard 200 at #70. A 7" vinyl single was released on July 22, featuring the title track and the song "Even Cowgirls Get the Blues" on the B-side. "Old White Lincoln" was released as the second single on December 1, 2008, in the UK. Opening track "Great Expectations" was released as the third single in the UK on March 23, 2009. In 2014, the bonus track "Once Upon a Time" was featured in the opening sequence and during the end credits of the 20th Century Fox film Devil's Due.

Influences
Allmusic described the album's sound as a "heartland rock version of Social Distortion."

Reception

Absolutepunk.net raved about The '59 Sound, writing: "Packed full of vivid imagery and storytelling that resembles Born to Run/Darkness on the Edge of Town-era Springsteen, The '59 Sound is an impeccable work of punk-rock art where each listen offers something new, never taking any hint of imagination or personal effect away from the listener; this is the album The Killers wanted to make with Sam's Town but were unsuccessful at." Mark Deming of AllMusic was generally favorable and concluded that "If Fallon often comes off as a youthful Springsteen wannabe on The '59 Sound, he also happens to be pretty good at it."

Track listing

Personnel 

The Gaslight Anthem
 Brian Fallon – lead vocals, guitar
 Alex Rosamilia – guitar, backing vocals, Wollensack
 Alex Levine – bass guitar, backing vocals
 Benny Horowitz – drums, tubular bells, tambourine, garbage cans, chains

Additional personnel
 Chris Wollard – additional vocals
 Joe Sirois – additional vocals
 Dicky Barrett – additional vocals
 Hollie Fallon – additional vocals
 Joe Sib – additional vocals
 Kim Yarbrough – additional vocals
 Gia Ciambotti – additional vocals
 Ryan Mall – samples

Production
 Ted Hutt – production, mix engineering
 Ryan Mall – production assistance, mix engineering
 Tom Baker – audio mastering
 Lisa Johnson – sleeve photography
 Jonas Kleiner – art direction, design

References

External links 

 

The Gaslight Anthem albums
2008 albums
SideOneDummy Records albums
Albums produced by Ted Hutt